Jeffrey Michael Terpko (born October 16, 1950) is a former Major League Baseball pitcher.

External links

1950 births
Living people
American expatriate baseball players in Canada
Baseball players from Pennsylvania
Buffalo Bisons (minor league) players
Burlington Rangers players
Burlington Senators players
Denver Bears players
Geneva Senators players
Greenville Rangers players
Major League Baseball pitchers
Montreal Expos players
People from Sayre, Pennsylvania
Pittsfield Senators players
Rochester Red Wings players
Spokane Indians players
Texas Rangers players